This is the electoral history of James Buchanan. He was the 15th president of the United States (1856-1860); 17th United States Secretary of State;  United States Minister to the United Kingdom and Russia; U.S. representative from Pennsylvania's third (1821-1823) and fourth congressional district (1823-1831); and U.S. senator from Pennsylvania (1834-1845).

United States House of Representatives elections

1820

1822

1824

1826

1828

United States Senate election

1834 

|-
|-bgcolor="#EEEEEE"
| colspan="3" align="right" | Totals
| align="right" | 133
| align="right" | 100.00%
|}

1836 

|-
|-bgcolor="#EEEEEE"
| colspan="3" align="right" | Totals
| align="right" | 133
| align="right" | 100.00%
|}

1843 

|-
|-bgcolor="#EEEEEE"
| colspan="3" align="right" | Totals
| align="right" | 132
| align="right" | 100.00%
|}

Democratic National Conventions

1844

Notes

1848

1852

1856

1856 United States presidential election 

Source (Popular Vote):  Source (Electoral Vote): 

(a) The popular vote figures exclude South Carolina where the Electors were chosen by the state legislature rather than by popular vote.

Sources and references 

James Buchanan
Buchanan, James
Buchanan, James